Heroes of the Fiery Cross is a book in praise of the Ku Klux Klan, published in 1928 by Protestant Bishop Alma Bridwell White, in which she "sounds the alarm about imagined threats to Protestant Americans from Catholics and Jews", according to author Peter Knight. In the book she asks rhetorically, "Who are the enemies of the Klan? They are the bootleggers, law-breakers, corrupt politicians, weak-kneed Protestant church members, white slavers, toe-kissers, wafer-worshippers, and every spineless character who takes the path of least resistance." She also argues that Catholics are removing the Bible from public schools. Another topic is her anti-Catholic stance towards the United States presidential election of 1928, in which Catholic Al Smith was running for president.

History
White was the author of more than 35 books published by the Pillar of Fire Church. In her writings and sermons her political views consisted of a mixture of women's equality, anti-catholicism, antisemitism, racism, nativism and white supremacy.  The book is a compendium of essays written by White and of illustrations by Reverend Branford Clarke that were originally published in the pro-Ku Klux Klan political periodical The Good Citizen, one of the numerous periodicals published by the Pillar of Fire Church at their communal headquarters in Zarephath, New Jersey.

The book contains an introductory letter of commendation from Hiram Wesley Evans, the then Imperial Wizard of the Ku Klux Klan. Heroes is the final work in a series of three books White published to promote the Klan. The other books were The Ku Klux Klan in Prophecy in 1925, and Klansmen: Guardians of Liberty, in 1926. White republished her Klan books as a three-volume set in 1943, three years before her death and 21 years after her initial association with the Klan, under the title Guardians of Liberty.

The book include essays with  titles such as Roman Catholic-Hebrew Alliance; Mussolini, Rome, and Reds; and Immigration and White Supremacy.

White supremacy
Alma White emphatically expresses her sympathy for former slaveowners since they were not compensated for their loss of "property" following the American Civil War. She expresses her fear and distress toward ongoing racial mixing and uses biblical citations as divine justification for white supremacy.

External links
 Cartoon illustrations in Heroes of the Fiery Cross on Flickr.

Further reading
Kristin E. Kandt, "Historical Essay: In the Name of God; An American Story of Feminism, Racism, and Religious Intolerance: The Story of Alma Bridwell White," in The American University Journal of Gender, Social Policy & the Law 8.3 (2000): 753-794
Lynn S. Neal, "Christianizing the Klan: Alma White, Branford Clarke, and the Art of Religious Intolerance," in Church History 78.2 (June 2009): 350-378.

References

Books about the Ku Klux Klan
Anti-Catholicism in the United States
Pillar of Fire International
1928 non-fiction books
Anti-black racism in the United States
Political books
White supremacy in the United States
Anti-Catholic publications